Franz von Suppè (until recently usually incorrectly von Suppé, né Francesco Ezechiele Ermenegildo de Suppè; 18 April 181921 May 1895) was an Austrian composer of light operas and other theatre music. He came from the Kingdom of Dalmatia, Austro-Hungarian Empire (now part of Croatia). A composer and conductor of the Romantic period, he is notable for his four dozen operettas.

Until recently, his name was usually incorrectly spelled Suppé with an acute accent or even without an accent as in the incorrect parish register entry, despite his father, grandfather, great grandfather, and great-great grandfather being recorded as Suppè with a normal Italian grave accent.

Life and education
Suppè's parents named him Francesco Ezechiele Ermenegildo when he was born on 18 April 1819 in Spalato, now Split, Dalmatia, Croatia. His father was a civil servant in the service of the Austrian Empire, as was his father before him; Suppè's mother was Viennese by birth. He simplified and Germanized his name when in Vienna, and changed de to the German equivalent von. Outside German-speaking circles, his name sometimes appears as Francesco and with the incorrect addition Demelli.

He spent his childhood in Zadar, where he had his first music lessons and began to compose at an early age. As a boy he had encouragement in music from a local bandmaster and by the Zara cathedral choirmaster. His Missa dalmatica dates from this early period. As a teenager in Zara, Suppè studied flute and harmony. His first extant composition is a Roman Catholic mass, which premiered at a Franciscan church in Zara in 1835.

From 1840 on he worked as a composer and conductor for Franz Pokorny, the director of several theaters in Vienna, Pressburg (now Bratislava), Ödenburg (now Sopron) and Baden bei Wien. In Vienna, after studying with Ignaz von Seyfried, he conducted in the theatre, with the opportunity to present his own operas there. Eventually, Suppè wrote music for over a hundred productions at the Theater in der Josefstadt as well as the Carltheater in Leopoldstadt, at the Theater an der Wien. He also put on some landmark opera productions, such as the 1846 production of Meyerbeer's Les Huguenots with Jenny Lind.

Suppè died in Vienna on 21 May 1895, and he is buried in the Zentralfriedhof.

Works
Suppé composed about 30 operettas and 180 farces, ballets, and other stage works. Although the bulk of his operettas have sunk into relative obscurity, the overtures – particularly Dichter und Bauer (Poet and Peasant, 1846) and Leichte Kavallerie (Light Cavalry, 1866) – remain popular, many of them having been used in soundtracks for films, cartoons, advertisements, and so on, in addition to being frequently played at symphonic "pops" concerts. Some of the operettas are still regularly performed, notably Boccaccio, Die schöne Galathée and Fatinitza; while Peter Branscombe, writing in The New Grove Dictionary of Music and Musicians, characterizes Suppé's song "" as "Austria's second national song".

Suppé retained links with his native Dalmatia, occasionally visiting Split (Spalato), Zadar (Zara), and Šibenik. Some of his works are linked with the region, in particular his operetta Des Matrosen Heimkehr, the action of which takes place in Hvar. After retiring from conducting, Suppé continued to write stage work, but increasingly shifted his interest to sacred music. He wrote a Requiem for theatre director Franz Pokorny (now very rarely heard); it was first performed on 22 November 1855, during Pokorny's memorial service; an oratorio, Extremum Judicum; three masses, among them the Missa Dalmatica; songs; symphonies; and concert overtures.

Two of Suppé's more ambitious operettas – Boccaccio and Donna Juanita – have been performed at the Metropolitan Opera in New York, but they failed to become repertoire works in the United States.

Posthumous use
The descriptive nature of Suppé's overtures has earned them frequent use in numerous animated cartoons:

Ein Morgen, ein Mittag, ein Abend in Wien (Morning, Noon, and Night in Vienna) was the central subject of the 1959 Bugs Bunny cartoon Baton Bunny. Poet and Peasant appears in the Fleischer Studios 1935 Popeye cartoon The Spinach Overture and the Oscar nominated Walter Lantz film of the same title; the overture to Light Cavalry is used in Disney's 1942 Mickey Mouse cartoon Symphony Hour.

The start of the cello solo (about one minute in) of the Poet and Peasant overture is nearly an exact match to the start of the folk song "I've Been Working on the Railroad", which was published in 1894. Turner Classic Movies runs a 1955 CinemaScope short of the MGM Symphony Orchestra turning in a vigorous performance of the overture.

The Light Cavalry Overture was covered in electronic form by Gordon Langford on his 1974 album The Amazing Music of the Electronic Arp Synthesiser.

Partial list of works

 Virginia (opera, L. Holt), 1837, not performed
 Gertrude della valle (opera, G. Brazzanovich), 1841, not performed
 Jung lustig, im Alter traurig, oder Die Folgen der Erziehung (comedy with songs, 3 acts, C. Wallis), TJ, 5 March 1841
 Die Hammerschmiedin aus Steyermark, oder Folgen einer Landpartie (local farce with songs, 2 acts, J. Schickh), Theater in der Josefstadt, 14 October 1842
 Ein Morgen, ein Mittag und ein Abend in Wien (local play with songs, 2 acts), Theater in der Josefstadt, 26 February 1844
 Marie, die Tochter des Regiments (vaudeville, 2 acts, F. Blum, after J. H. St Georges and J. F. A. Bayard), Theater in der Josefstadt, 13 June 1844
 Der Krämer und sein Kommis (farce with songs, 2 acts, F. Kaiser), Theater in der Josefstadt, 28 September 1844
 Die Müllerin von Burgos (vaudeville, 2 acts, J. Kupelwieser), Theater in der Josefstadt, 8 March 1845
 Sie ist verheiratet (comedy with songs, 3 acts, Kaiser), Theater an der Wien, 7 November 1845
 Dichter und Bauer (comedy with songs, 3 acts, K. Elmar), Theater an der Wien, 24 August 1846, full score (1900)
 Das Mädchen vom Lande (opera, 3 acts, Elmar), Theater an der Wien, 7 August 1847
 Martl, oder Der Portiunculatag in Schnabelhausen (farce with music, parody of Flotow: Martha, 3 acts, A. Berla), Theater an der Wien, 16 December 1848
 Des Teufels Brautfahrt, oder Böser Feind und guter Freund (magic farce with songs, 3 acts, Elmar), Theater an der Wien, 30 January 1849
 Gervinus, der Narr von Untersberg, oder Ein patriotischer Wunsch (farce with songs, 3 acts, Berla), Braunhirschen-Arena [and Theater an der Wien], 1 July 1849
 Unterthänig und unabhängig, oder Vor und nach einem Jahre (comedy with songs, 3 acts, Elmar), Theater an der Wien, 13 October 1849
 s'Alraunl (romantic tale with songs, 3 acts, A. von Klesheim), Theater an der Wien, 13 November 1849
 Der Dumme hat's Glück (farce with songs, 3 acts, Berla), Theater an der Wien, 29 June 1850
 Dame Valentine, oder Frauenräuber und Wanderbursche (Singspiel, 3 acts, Elmar), Theater an der Wien, 9 January 1851
 Der Tannenhäuser (dramatic poem with music, H. von Levitschnigg), Theater an der Wien, 27 February 1852
 Wo steckt der Teufel? (farce with songs, 3 acts, ?Grün), Theater an der Wien, 28 June 1854
 Paragraph 3 (opera, 3 acts, M. A. Grandjean), Hofoper, 8 January 1858
  (operetta, 1 acts, C. K.), Theater an der Wien, 24 November 1860, vocal score (n.d.)
 Die Kartenschlägerin (Pique-Dame) (operetta, 1 act), Kaitheater, 26 April 1862
 Mädchen und kein Mann (operetta, 1 act, W. Friedrich), Kaitheater, 25 October 1862, vocal score (n.d.)
  (operetta, 1, J. Braun), Kaitheater, 18 April 1863, vocal score (n.d.)
 Das Corps der Rache (operetta, 1 act, J. L. Harisch), Carltheater, 5 March 1864
  (Liederspiel, 1 act, H. Max), Carltheater, 10 September 1864
 Dinorah, oder Die Turnerfahrt nach Hütteldorf (parody opera, of Meyerbeer, 3 acts, F. Hopp), Carltheater, 4 May 1865
 Die schöne Galathée (Beautiful Galatea) (comic-mythological operetta, l act, Poly Henrion), Berlin, Meysels-Theater, 30 June 1865, vocal score (n.d.)
 Leichte Kavallerie or Die Tochter der Puszta (operetta, 2 acts, C. Costa), Carltheater, 21 March 1866
  (operetta, 2, Costa), Carltheater, 23 October 1866
  (operetta, 1 act, B. Boutonnier), Carltheater, 27 April 1867
  (magic operetta, 3, Costa), Carltheater, 20 January 1868, vocal score (Leipzig, n.d.)
 Isabella (operetta, J. Weyl), Carltheater, 5 November 1869
 Tantalusqualen (operetta), Carltheater, 3 October 1868
  (parody operetta of Wagner's Lohengrin, 3 acts, Costa, Grandjean), Carltheater, 30 November 1870
 Canebas (operetta, 1 act, J. Doppler), Carltheater, 2 November 1872
 Fatinitza (operetta, 3 acts, F. Zell, R. Genée), Carltheater, 5 January 1876, full score (n.d.)
  (fantastic operetta, 3 acts, J. Hopp), Carltheater, 5 January 1878, vocal score (London, n.d.)
 Boccaccio (operetta, 3 acts, Zell, Genée), Carltheater, 1 February 1879, full score (Hamburg, n.d.)
 Donna Juanita (operetta, 3 acts, Zell, Genée), Carltheater, 21 February 1880, full score (Brussels, n.d.); arr. K. Pauspertl as Die grosse Unbekannte, 1925
 Der Gascogner (operetta, 3 acts, Zell, Genée), Carltheater, 21 or ?22 March 1881, vocal score (Hamburg, n.d.)
 Das Herzblättchen (operetta, 3 acts, C. Tetzlaff), Carltheater, 4 February 1882
  (operetta, 3 acts, M. West, Genée, O. F. Berg), Theater an der Wien, 17 March 1883, full score (Hamburg, n.d.)
 Des Matrosen Heimkehr (romantic opera, 2 acts, A. Langner), Hamburg, 4 May 1885, vocal score (Hamburg, 1885)
 Bellman (comic opera, 3 acts, West, L. Held), Theater an der Wien, 26 or ?24 February 1887
 Joseph Haydn (musical portrait with melodies by Haydn, F. von Radler), Theater in der Josefstadt, 30 April 1887
 Die Jagd nach dem Glücke (operetta, 3 acts, Genée, B. Zappert), Carltheater, 27 October 1888, full score (Hamburg, n.d.)
 Das Modell (operetta, 3 acts, V. Leon, Held), Carltheater, 4 October 1895, full score (Leipzig, n.d.) [completed by J. Stern and A. Zamara]
 Die Pariserin, oder Das heimliche Bild (operetta, 3 acts, Léon, Held), Carltheater, 26 January 1898 [arr. of Die Frau Meisterin, 1868]

References

Further reading
Blažeković, Zdravko. "Franz von Suppé und Dalmatien", Studien zur Musikwissenschaft: Beihefte der Denkmäler der Tonkunst in Österreich, 43 (1994), 262–272.
Gänzl, Kurt. The Encyclopedia of Musical Theatre (3 Volumes). New York: Schirmer Books, 2001.
Traubner, Richard. Operetta: A Theatrical History. Garden City, New York: Doubleday & Company, 1983
 : Franz von Suppè (1819–1895). Mensch. Mythos. Musiker. Ehrenbürger von Gars. Begleitpublikation zur Jubiläums-Ausstellung des . Contributions by Andreas Weigel, Anton Ehrenberger, Ingrid Scherney and Christine Steininger. (Gars am Kamp) 2019. .

External links

 Andreas Weigel: On Franz von Suppè’s ancestors and his early years at Zadar. Round table on Franz von Suppè at the University of Zadar. 15 November 2019.
 George Hamilton: Tall tales from the 'Father of Viennese Operetta'. In: Irish Independent. April 18, 2020.
 Georg Predota: A Matter of Discretion. Franz von Suppé, Therese Merville and Sofie Strasser. When did Suppé actually meet his two wives?
 Zadar Tourist Board: The Greatest Operetta Composer, Franz Von Suppè, Spent His Youth in Zadar.
 List of stage works by Franz von Suppé (with other composers)
 
List of works by von Suppé at the Index to Opera and Ballet Sources Online
 Light Cavalry, performed by Andre Rieu
 
 
 
 Franz von Suppé recordings at the Discography of American Historical Recordings.

1819 births
1895 deaths
19th-century classical composers
19th-century conductors (music)
Austrian conductors (music)
Austrian male classical composers
Austrian opera composers
Austrian operetta composers
Austrian people of Belgian descent
Austrian people of Italian descent
Austrian Romantic composers
Austro-Hungarian people
People from the Kingdom of Dalmatia
Burials at the Vienna Central Cemetery
Male conductors (music)
Male opera composers
Male operetta composers
Musicians from Zadar
Composers from Vienna